Pregomisin is a chemical compound isolated from Schisandra chinensis.

References

Phenols